Donald Currie (1825 – 1909), a British shipowner.

Donald Currie may also refer to:

Donald Currie (born 1930), grandson of the 5th of the Currie baronets
Don Currie (born 1934), New Zealand cricketer
Donald Currie (field hockey)

See also
Donald Curry (disambiguation)
Donald Rusk Currey, American professor of geography
Currie (surname)